Carl Söderlund (born 3 June 1997) is a former Swedish tennis player. 

Söderlund reached a career high ATP singles ranking of 387 achieved on 8 May 2017. In the ATP doubles ranking he reached a career high of 1303 achieved on 10 October 2016. Söderlund won 3 ITF Futures titles on the ITF Men's Circuit. 

Söderlund made his ATP main draw debut at the 2016 Swedish Open, where he received a wildcard into the singles main draw. He faced fellow wildcard and compatriot Fred Simonsson in the first round.

ATP Challenger and ITF Futures finals

Singles: 4 (3–1)

External links

1997 births
Living people
Swedish male tennis players
Tennis players from Stockholm
Virginia Cavaliers men's tennis players
21st-century Swedish people